Happy Together is a 1989 American romantic comedy film directed by Mel Damski and starring Patrick Dempsey and Helen Slater.

Plot
Christopher is a very serious-minded young man from Chicago. Enrolling into college in LA as a freshman he finds his roommate is someone named Alex, who turns out to be a woman from Park Avenue, NYC.

When Christopher arrives, he finds the room covered with his roommate's things. After both he and Alex are in the room, Chris sits down to confront him, he's surprised Alex is a girl. She moved in a week early and takes up most of the room. They have been placed together by a computer error. He finds the pairing intolerable and tries his best to find another place to live. The dorms are full and he is resigned, at least for the time being, to make the best of his current situation.

Alex, a seemingly extroverted party girl, shows little interest in academics and breezes into the room, disrupting, demanding full attention at any moment. After 'dinner together', which turns out to nibbling here and there in a supermarket, he gets enthusiastic about her. Buying her a bunch of helium balloons, he arrives to their building only to find her zip off on Slash's motorcycle. She treats Chris as if he is simply there for when she needs him.

Complete opposites, Chris thinks out and plans everything, whereas she constantly does things spontaneously. While scene painting, she instigates a paint fight, and later on, they play the game, 'Love Songs', name the musical and finish the lyrics. They move up to the roof, doing a musical number.

They are both told that their work is lacking something, for Chris in his writing and Alex in her acting. Alex tells Chris he needs a muse, and his writing professor reiterates this idea, write because he needs to or feels compelled to, not because he is obligated to. As fate intervenes, the two slowly begin to realize that they do like one another after all. It manifests itself as a sexual relationship wherein each finds a need filled by the other. Both of them improve once they get involved, as they invest more of themselves, it is visible in their craft.

Alex gets a nasty message written about her on the shower wall after she volunteers at a kissing booth. They fight, making up with dinner, however Chris storms out when men continually buy her drinks.

Alex's ex, Slash, returns right before midterms, and he breaks Chris' arm. Having to 
get his arm plastered, he isn't able to study for midterms, so she suggests he put the answers on his cast. Caught, he can either redo the semester or leave.

Packing up, Chris is about to go, but confronts Alex, convincing her to take a chance on him. She agrees. In the closing credits, they both stayed and finished their degrees. They later moved to NYC to pursue their careers.

Cast
 Patrick Dempsey as Christopher Wooden 
 Helen Slater as Alexandra Page 
 Dan Schneider as Stan 
 Kevin Hardesty as 'Slash' 
 Marius Weyers as Denny Dollenbacher 
 Barbara Babcock as Ruth Carpenter 
 Gloria Hayes as Luisa Dellacova 
 Brad Pitt as Brian 
 Aaron Harnick as Wally 
 Ron Sterling as Trevor 
 Eric Lumbard as Gary 
 Michael D. Clarke as Steve 
 Wendy Lee Marconi as Dory 
 Yvette Rambo as Jill 
 Shawne Rowe as Geri

References

External links
  
 
 
 Happy Together at The Numbers

1989 films
1989 independent films
1989 romantic comedy films
American independent films
American romantic comedy films
Films directed by Mel Damski
Films scored by Robert Folk
Films scored by Robert J. Walsh
Films set in universities and colleges
Films shot in Los Angeles
1980s English-language films
1980s American films